Lilaeopsis schaffneriana is a rare species of flowering plant in the family Apiaceae known by the common names Schaffner's grasswort and cienega false rush.

Lilaeopsis schaffneriana subsp. schaffneriana is found in Dominican Republic, Ecuador, and Mexico (in the Federal District and the following states: Chihuahua, Coahuila, Durango, Hidalgo, Jalisco, México, Michoacán, Nuevo León, Oaxaca, Puebla, San Luis Potosí, and Tlaxcala).
Lilaeopsis schaffneriana subsp. recurva (Huachuca water umbel), is a federally listed endangered species (status G4T2, imperiled) of the United States. It is limited to desert wetlands, including a rare type of desert marsh habitat called a cienega. There are 8 populations in Arizona and four more south of the border in Mexico.

Conservation 
The species is extremely reliant on water level for its survival.

References

External links
USFWS. Designation of Critical Habitat for the Huachuca Water Umbel, a Plant. Federal Register July 12, 1999.

schaffneriana
Halophytes
Flora of Mexico
Flora of the Southwestern United States
Flora of Arizona
Flora of the Dominican Republic
Flora of Ecuador
Plants described in 1854
Taxa named by John Merle Coulter
Least concern flora of the United States
Least concern flora of North America